The 2019 Mississippi State Bulldogs football team represented Mississippi State University in the 2019 NCAA Division I FBS football season. The Bulldogs played their home games at Davis Wade Stadium in Starkville, Mississippi, and competed in the Western Division of the Southeastern Conference (SEC). They were led by second-year head coach Joe Moorhead.  Following the team's loss in the Music City Bowl Moorhead was fired as the Bulldogs' head coach.

Previous season
The Bulldogs finished the 2018 regular season 8–4, 4–4 in SEC play to finish in fourth in the Western Division. They were invited to play in the Outback Bowl, where they lost against Iowa.

Preseason

SEC media poll
The SEC media poll was released on July 19, 2019 with the Bulldogs predicted to finish in fifth place in the West Division.

Preseason All-SEC teams
To be released

Schedule
Mississippi State announced its 2019 football schedule on September 18, 2018. The 2019 schedule consisted of 7 home and 5 away games in the regular season.

Schedule Source:

Personnel

Coaching staff
Staff from 2019.

Game summaries

vs. Louisiana

Southern Miss

Kansas State

Mississippi State led in almost every statistical category:  more first downs (21-17); more total yards (352-269), more yards rushing (201-146), and more yards passing (151-123). Both teams committed 3 turnovers and 7 penalties and Mississippi State controlled the game clock, holding possession for 33:05 to K-States 26:55.

Solid statistical production wasn't enough, as Kansas State ended up winning the game 31-24.

Kentucky

at Auburn

at Tennessee

LSU

at Texas A&M

at Arkansas

Alabama

Abilene Christian

Ole Miss

vs Louisville (Music City Bowl)

Rankings

Players drafted into the NFL

References

Mississippi State
Mississippi State Bulldogs football seasons
Mississippi State Bulldogs football